Pudupattinam may refer to:

Pudupattinam, Chengalpattu
Pudupattinam, Pattukkottai taluk
Pudupattinam, Thanjavur taluk

See also
Pudupatti (disambiguation)